The FIBA Africa Championship 1993 was hosted by Kenya from September 18 to September 28, 1993.  The games were played in Nairobi. The top two countries in this FIBA Africa Championship earned the two berths allocated to Africa for the 1994 FIBA World Championship in Canada. Angola won the tournament, the country's 3rd consecutive African championship, by beating Egypt in the final.

Competing Nations
The following national teams competed:

Preliminary rounds

Group A

Day 1

Day 2

Day 3

Group B

Day 1

Day 2

Day 3

Day 4

Day 5

Knockout stage

Classification Stage

Final standings

Angola and Egypt qualified for the 1994 FIBA World Championship in Canada.

Awards

External links
 FIBA Archive

B
1993 in African basketball
AfroBasket
International basketball competitions hosted by Kenya
September 1993 sports events in Africa